Rosario de Lerma is a department located in Salta Province, Argentina. Its main settlements are Rosario de Lerma (the capital) and Campo Quijano.

Geography

Overview
The department is located in the north-central side of the province, near the Andes, and includes part of the Puna de Atacama. It borders with Jujuy Province and the departments of La Caldera, Capital, Cerrillos, Chicoana, Cachi and La Poma. The territorial strip linking the northern and southern side of La Poma Department separates Rosario de Lerma from Los Andes Department.

Places
Towns and municipalities:
 Rosario de Lerma (17,871 inh.)
 Campo Quijano (7,274 inh.)
 La Silleta (1,256 inh.)
 Santa Rosa de Tastil (11 inh.)

Other localities and places:
 Abra Muñano
 Alfarcito
 Cachiñal
 Chorrillos
 Diego de Almagro
 El Alisal
 El Rosal
 El Manzano
 Gobernador Solá
 Incahuasi
 Incamayo
 Ingeniero Maury
 Las Cuevas
 Manizales
 Meseta 
 Puerta Tastil
 San Bernardo de las Zorras
 Tacuara
 Villa Angélica

See also 
Tren a las Nubes
Salta–Antofagasta railway

References

External links 
 Rosario de Lerma Department on Salta Province website

Departments of Salta Province